Johan Arnold Zoutman (10 May 1724, Reeuwijk – 7 May 1793, The Hague) was a Dutch naval figure and rear admiral who fought at the Battle of Dogger Bank in the Fourth Anglo-Dutch War.
Zoutman also fought in the American Revolutionary War.

Legacy
In 1798, Fort Zoutman was built in his name at Oranjestad and is the oldest Dutch structure on the island of Aruba. The Willem III Tower was built at the west entrance of the fort in 1868 and has functioned as a clock tower, lighthouse and a station for the Aruba Police Force. The fort now houses the Aruba Historical Museum.

Gallery

References

1724 births
1793 deaths
18th-century Dutch people
People from Reeuwijk
Admirals of the navy of the Dutch Republic
18th-century Dutch military personnel